Queen Street may refer to:

Australia
 Queen Street, Brisbane
 Queen Street, Fremantle
 Queen Street, Melbourne
 Queen Street, Woollahra, Sydney

Canada
 Queen Street, Hamilton
 Queen Street, Ottawa
 Queen Street, Toronto
 Queen Street East, Brampton (Peel Regional Road 107), in Brampton, Ontario
 Queen Street West, Brampton (Peel Regional Road 6), in Brampton, Ontario

United Kingdom

England
 Queen Street, Oxford
 Queen Street, London, in the City of London
 Queen Street, Mayfair, London

Scotland
 Queen Street, Glasgow
 Queen Street, Edinburgh

Wales
 Queen Street, Cardiff, Wales

Other places
 Queen Street, Boston, a previous name of Court Street
 Queen Street, Auckland, New Zealand
 Queen Street, Dublin, Ireland
 Queen Street, Hong Kong, in Sheung Wan
 Queen Street, Penang, also locally known as Lebuh Queen, Malaysia
 Queen Street, Singapore

See also
 Queen Street station (disambiguation)
 Great Queen Street, London